Melville Richard Kenneth "Wang" Wyness  (23 January 1937 – 6 November 2011) was a South African rugby union player.

Playing career
Wyness was born in Colesberg and first went to school at Marist Brothers' College in Rondebosch, where he inherited his nickname from his older brother. He moved to Sea Point Boys' High and then played for 12 seasons for Hamiltons RFC.

Wyness made his test match debut for the Springboks against the 1962 British Lions, when Dave Stewart was injured shortly before the test and he was surprisingly selected to replace him. He played in all for tests against the Lions and then one further test against  in 1963.

He retired to Onrus and died at home on 6 November 2011 after a battle with cancer.

Test history

See also
List of South Africa national rugby union players – Springbok no. 381

References

1937 births
2011 deaths
South African rugby union players
South Africa international rugby union players
Hamilton RFC, Sea Point players
Western Province (rugby union) players
Rugby union players from the Northern Cape
Rugby union centres